"D.W. Washburn" is a song written by Jerry Leiber and Mike Stoller, recorded by both the Coasters and the Monkees. It was also included in the musical Smokey Joe's Cafe (revue).

The Monkees' version was a non-album single and a double-sided hit, backed with "It's Nice to Be with You," also a non-album single. The music was arranged and conducted by Shorty Rogers.

Lyrics
The lyrics tell a story of a derelict (Washburn) who is chosen by a well-meaning charity to be cleaned up and fed a meal. Washburn declines the offer, preferring his jobless, drunken but easygoing lifestyle to a life of responsibility. He mentions, "I do believe I got it made."

Recordings
Recorded during the sessions for The Birds, the Bees & the Monkees, the Monkees' version of "D.W. Washburn" was the first single that they released after the second and final season of their NBC television series had concluded. All of their previous singles had reached the top three positions on the Billboard Top 100 because of heavy promotion during episodes of the television show; without this exposure, "D.W. Washburn" became the band's first to miss the top ten in the U.S., reaching #19. It was also their last American Top 40 single until "That Was Then, This Is Now" in 1986.

Colgems Records president Lester Sill later regretted his decision to release the song as the followup to "Valleri," saying: "I loved the sound of the song – the demo that I heard. Then I realized after we did it and it came out that it was really a downer. It was a story about a guy in the gutter, about a bum. I thought that there was kind of a comical, dixieland feel to it that I felt was rather different. In hindsight, I realized it was an awful mistake."

Peter Tork said: "Originally, there was a black bass singer on the take. Bert Schneider said, 'Wait a minute! It’s one thing to have Tommy (Boyce) and Bobby (Hart) singing 'ohhs' and 'ahhs' in the background; it's another to have a prominent black bass singer responding that way.' The only thing about that song that was noticeable was that it's Leiber-Stoller. I imagine it was an old Leiber-Stoller tune from way, way back that nobody had done yet. It sounds like middle Coasters, you know. The thing about the Monkees project at the end was, I think basically Bert and Bob (Rafelson) were running out of steam. That's what I think. I think for some reason, somehow, they had had it. They started off with a lot of enthusiasm, and I think the pressures brought them down. I think Bert's still reeling, to tell you the truth." The original version with the black bass singer was released on The Birds, The Bees & The Monkees box set in 2010.

The Coasters released their version of the song in July 1968, which they had recorded on October 31, 1967 for Date Records. The B-side of the song was "Everybody's Woman."

A medley of "D.W. Washburn" and "L. David Sloane (A Good Man Is Hard to Find)" by the Hutch Davie Calliope Band entered the Cash Box Looking Ahead survey on August 25, 1968.

The Monkees continued to perform the song during their 1980s and later reunions, including a performance on Nashville Now, a country music showcase.

"It's Nice to Be With You"
Also recorded during the sessions for The Birds, the Bees & the Monkees was the B-side "It's Nice to Be With You." Written by Jerry Goldstein, it also charted in the U.S., reaching #51 on the Billboard Hot 100 and #26 on the Cash Box chart. Its greatest success occurred in Canada, where it reached #15.

References

Songs written by Jerry Leiber and Mike Stoller
1968 singles
The Monkees songs
The Coasters songs
1967 songs
RCA Records singles